The Indian women's football champions are the winners of the highest national league in women's football in India. In 2016, the Indian Women's League was incorporated.

A proper league system for women's football was established in 2016 with the commencement of Indian Women's League (IWL), The league was launched as India's first professional football league for women with the aim to increase the player pool for India national team. Since 2019–20, the clubs that become champions are granted an opportunity to play in the AFC Women's Club Championship, the top tier women's club football competition in Asia.

List of League Champions

Performance by club

See also
 Indian Women's League
 Football in India
 Women's football in India

References 

I
 
India